Rashod D. Kent (born June 7, 1980) is a former American football tight end who played one season with the Houston Texans of the National Football League. He played college basketball at Rutgers University and attended Fairmont Senior High School in Fairmont, West Virginia. He was also a member of the Oakland Raiders.

Professional career
Kent was signed by the Houston Texans on April 28, 2002. He was released by the Houston Texans on April 27, 2004. He signed with the Oakland Raiders August 4, 2004.

References

External links
Just Sports Stats

Living people
1980 births
Players of American football from West Virginia
American football tight ends
African-American players of American football
Rutgers Scarlet Knights men's basketball players
Scottish Claymores players
Houston Texans players
Sportspeople from Fairmont, West Virginia
American men's basketball players
Fairmont Senior High School alumni
21st-century African-American sportspeople
20th-century African-American people